1055 Tynka, provisional designation , is a stony Florian asteroid from the inner regions of the asteroid belt, approximately 10 kilometers in diameter. It was discovered on 17 November 1925, by Czech astronomer Emil Buchar at the Algiers Observatory in North Africa, who named it after his mother Tynka Buchar.

Orbit and classification 

Tynka is a member of the Flora family, a giant asteroid family and the largest family of stony asteroids in the main belt. It orbits the Sun in the inner asteroid belt at a distance of 1.7–2.7 AU once every 3 years and 3 months (1,190 days). Its orbit has an eccentricity of 0.21 and an inclination of 5° with respect to the ecliptic.

Physical characteristics 

Tynka is a common stony S-type asteroid in both the Tholen and SMASS classification, which agrees with the overall spectral type for members of the Flora family.

Rotation period 

Three rotational lightcurves of Tynka were independently obtained from photometric observations by astronomers David Higgins, Agnieszka Kryszczyńska and Robert Stephens. Lightcurve analysis gave a rotation period of 11.75 and 11.893 hours with a brightness variation between 0.06 and 0.33 magnitude. An alternative period solution of 5.9818 hours with an amplitude of 0.17 was measured by French amateur astronomer René Roy in April 2012.

Diameter and albedo 

According to the surveys carried out by the Japanese Akari satellite and the NEOWISE mission of NASA's Wide-field Infrared Survey Explorer, Tynka measures 8.95 and 13.48 kilometers in diameter and its surface has an albedo of 0.169 and 0.350, respectively.

The Collaborative Asteroid Lightcurve Link assumes an albedo of 0.24 – derived from 8 Flora, the largest member and namesake of the Flora family – and calculates a diameter of 10.31 kilometers based on an absolute magnitude of 12.1.

Naming 

This minor planet was named by the discoverer after his mother Tynka Buchar. The official naming citation was mentioned in The Names of the Minor Planets by Paul Herget in 1955. Emil Buchar (1901–1979) worked at the Institute of Astronomy and Geophysics at the Technical University in Prague and was a pioneer of satellite geodesy. This asteroid was his only minor-planet discovery. The minor planet  was named in his honor.

References

External links 
 Asteroid Lightcurve Database (LCDB), query form (info )
 Dictionary of Minor Planet Names, Google books
 Asteroids and comets rotation curves, CdR – Observatoire de Genève, Raoul Behrend
 Discovery Circumstances: Numbered Minor Planets (1)-(5000) – Minor Planet Center
 
 

001055
Named minor planets
001055
001055
19251117